Nicole Macri (born 1973) is an American politician, who was elected to the Washington House of Representatives in the 2016 elections. A member of the Democratic Party, she represents the 43rd district.

Prior to her election to the legislature, Macri served as deputy director of Seattle's Downtown Emergency Service Center.

References

External links

Living people
Democratic Party members of the Washington House of Representatives
Lesbian politicians
LGBT state legislators in Washington (state)
Women state legislators in Washington (state)
Politicians from Seattle
21st-century American politicians
21st-century American women politicians
1973 births